The Alaska Native Regional Corporations were established in 1971 when the United States Congress passed the Alaska Native Claims Settlement Act (ANCSA) which settled land and financial claims made by the Alaska Natives and provided for the establishment of 13 regional corporations to administer those claims.

Associations, regional and village corporations
Under ANCSA the state was originally divided into twelve regions, each represented by a "Native association" responsible for the enrollment of past and present residents of the region.  Individual Alaska Natives enrolled in these associations, and their village level equivalents, were made shareholder in the Regional and Village Corporations created by the Act. The twelve for-profit regional corporations, and a thirteenth region representing those Alaska Natives who were no longer residents of Alaska in 1971, were awarded the monetary and property compensation created by ANCSA.  Village corporations and their shareholders received compensation through the regional corporations.  The fact that many ostensibly Alaska Native villages throughout the state were not empowered by the ANCSA to form village corporations later led to a number of lawsuits.

The regional and village corporations are now owned by Alaska Native people through privately owned shares of corporation stock. Alaska Natives alive at ANCSA's enactment on December 17, 1971, who enrolled in a Native association (at the regional and/or village level) received 100 shares of stock in the respective corporation. In 2006, the 109th Congress passed S.449 which amended ANCSA, and allowed for shares to be more easily issued to those who had missed the enrollment, or were born after the enrollment period by reducing the requirement for voting from a majority of shareholders to a majority of attending shareholders at corporation meetings.

During the 1970s, ANCSA regional and village corporations selected land in and around native villages in the state in proportion to their enrolled populations.  Village corporations own the surface rights to the lands they selected, but regional corporations own the subsurface rights of both their own selections and of those of the village corporations.

Text of the Act
The Act lays out the specifics of the corporations' status.  Here is an excerpt of the relevant portion:

43 U.S.C. § 1606

(a) Division of Alaska into twelve geographic regions; common heritage and common interest of region; area of region commensurate with operations of Native association; boundary disputes, arbitration. For purposes of this chapter, the State of Alaska shall be divided by the Secretary within one year after December 18, 1971, into twelve geographic regions, with each region composed as far as practicable of Natives having a common heritage and sharing common interests. In the absence of good cause shown to the contrary, such regions shall approximate the areas covered by the operations of the following existing Native associations:

(1) Arctic Slope Native Association (Utqiaġvik, Point Hope, Point Lay, Wainwright, Atqasuk, Nuiqsut, Kaktovik, Anaktuvuk Pass);

(2) Bering Straits Association (Seward Peninsula, Unalakleet, Saint Lawrence Island);

(3) Northwest Alaska Native Association (Kotzebue);

(4) Association of Village Council Presidents (southwest coast, all villages in the Bethel area, including all villages on the Lower Yukon River and the Lower Kuskokwim River);

(5) Tanana Chiefs' Conference (Koyukuk, Middle and Upper Yukon Rivers, Upper Kuskokwim, Tanana River);

(6) Cook Inlet Association (Kenai, Tyonek, Eklutna, Iliamna);

(7) Bristol Bay Native Association (Dillingham, Upper Alaska Peninsula);

(8) Aleut League (Aleutian Islands, Pribilof Islands and that part of the Alaska Peninsula which is in the Aleut League);

(9) Chugach Native Association (Cordova, Tatitlek, Port Graham, English Bay, Valdez, and Seward);

(10) Tlingit-Haida Central Council (southeastern Alaska, including Metlakatla);

(11) Kodiak Area Native Association (all villages on and around Kodiak Island); and

(12) Copper River Native Association (Copper Center, Glennallen, Chitina, Mentasta).

[...]

(c) Establishment of thirteenth region for nonresident Natives; majority vote; Regional Corporation for thirteenth region. [...]

(d) Incorporation; business for profit; eligibility for benefits; provisions in articles for carrying out chapter. Five incorporators within each region, named by the Native association in the region, shall incorporate under the laws of Alaska a Regional Corporation to conduct business for profit, which shall be eligible for the benefits of this chapter so long as it is organized and functions in accordance with this chapter. The articles of incorporation shall include provisions necessary to carry out the terms of this chapter.

The thirteen regional corporations created under ANCSA are:

Alaska Native village corporations
There are over 200 village corporations, corresponding to the list of villages published in the text of ANCSA.  Most corporations serve a single village, though some smaller villages have consolidated their corporations over the years.

AFOGNAK NATIVE CORPORATION
The Afognak Native Corporation was organized in 1977 through the merger of two ANCSA village corporations:  Port Lions Native Corporation and Natives of Afognak, Inc.  It is governed by a nine-member board of directors.  Afognak Native Corporation has many business interests.  For 18 years it participated in and profited from timber development ventures on Afogank Island.  It also operates a number of successful subsidiaries including Leasing, Bioenergy Operations and Oil Field Services.  In the late 1990s, the Afognak Native Corporation launched a government contracting business. The Afognak Native Corporation is a wealthy corporation and was listed in the Top 100 Contractors of the Federal Government in 2010. Coming in at No. 79, The Afognak Native Corporation's contracts were $749,557,576.49.  Afognak Native Corporation entities also received NASA Small Business Contractor of the Year Award in 2013.
  The Corporation's profile is listed as "Construction and Engineering" services.  The Afognak Native Corporation has approximately 900 shareholders and pays over $12 million in dividends annually.  The Afognak Native Corporation controls over 160,000 acres of land in the Kodiak Archipelago and the lands form the core of financial success of the corporation.

Subsequent legislation and litigation 
The federal Indian Self-Determination and Education Assistance Act of 1975 (ISDA) gave self-autonomy to both Native Indian tribal governments and to ANCs.

While the federal government had generally recognized that ANCs fell under "tribal governments" since the passage of the ISDA, three Native Indian tribes from the lower 48 states sued the Treasury, asserting that the ANCs were not federally-recognized "tribal governments" under a statutory interpretation of the law. This led to the United States Supreme Court case, Yellen v. Confederated Tribes of the Chehalis Reservation, which was decided in June 2021 that under ISDA, the ANCs were federally-recognized "tribal governments" and thus qualified for CARES funds.

Financial Performance

See also 
Compare:
 Makivik Corporation, an Inuit-owned company in Nunavik, Quebec created by a land claims agreement
 Nunatsiavut, an autonomous Inuit Land Claims Area in Newfoundland and Labrador
 Emil Notti, key developer of ANCSA

Notes

References

Gavin Kentch, A Corporate Culture? The Environmental Justice Challenges of the Alaska Native Claims Settlement Act, 81  813 (2012).

External links
 www.nativeco.com The place to go for Alaska Native Corporation business, run by www.morganhowardproductions.com
 Alaska Natives & American Indians resources from the Justice Center, University of Alaska Anchorage.
 The Alaska Native Claims Settlement Act Resource Center run by Landye Bennett Blumstein LLP.
 www.ancsa.net a portal dedicated to ANCSA run by Karabelnikoff & Associates

1971 establishments in Alaska
Corporation